Sebastian Knabe (born 13 October 1978) is a retired German decathlete. His personal best score was 8151 points, achieved in June 2001 in Ratingen.

Achievements

References

1978 births
Living people
German decathletes